Village of the Pharoahs is the eighth album by American saxophonist and composer Pharoah Sanders, released in 1973 on the Impulse! label.

In 2011, Impulse! reissued the album, along with Wisdom Through Music, as part of a compilation titled Village of the Pharoahs/Wisdom Through Music.

Reception

The AllMusic review by Scott Yanow stated that "there are many more significant Pharoah Sanders records than this one."

Writing for PopMatters, Sean Murphy commented: "The results are impressive and if they sound a bit dated, it's worth asking how this music stacks up with what is being made today. In this writer's opinion, it holds up quite nicely indeed... This is the work of a confident explorer willing to go anywhere and do anything, and a cursory glance at any of Sanders' unsmiling album covers from this period makes the conditions clear: strap in and come along for the ride because once we start we aren't slowing down... Village of The Pharoahs is a time machine that involves neither physics nor hot tubs... a more than solid outing from Sanders in his prime is nothing to shake a sax at."

Track listing
All compositions by Pharoah Sanders

Personnel
Pharoah Sanders - tenor saxophone, soprano saxophone, percussion, vocals, bells
Joe Bonner - piano, shakuhachi, flute, percussion, vocals
Stanley Clarke (track 5), Calvin Hill (tracks 1-4 & 7), Cecil McBee (track 5) - bass
Norman Connors - drums (track 5)
Kylo Kylo - tambura, percussion (tracks 1-3 & 7)
Lawrence Killian - conga, percussion, vocals (tracks 1-5 & 7)
Jimmy Hopps - drums, percussion, vocals (tracks 1-3 & 7)
Kenneth Nash - sakara, murdunom, percussion, whistles (track 1-4 & 7)
Sedatrius Brown - vocals (track 1-4 & 7)

References

Impulse! Records albums
Pharoah Sanders albums
1973 albums